The Kuala Kangsar railway station is a Malaysian train station located at the north-western side of and named after the town of Kuala Kangsar, Perak. Owned by Keretapi Tanah Melayu, it provides KTM ETS services.

In July 2008 it was announced that a new station would be built at Kampung Talang Simpang Tiga nearby, and the old station retained as a railway museum. The decision was reverted in October 2008, ostensibly to spare affected villagers from relocation while there arose land acquisition problems. The Malay press, Utusan Malaysia, 13 October 2008, quoted Sultan Azlan Shah: the station was too old to be retained as a heritage building.

References

External links
 Kuala Kangsar Railway Station

KTM ETS railway stations
Kuala Kangsar District
Railway stations in Perak